Ekstase – The Return of Alleinunterhalter vol. 4 is the third (although the album says it is the fourth volume) album from German comedy artist Mambo Kurt. this album includes collection of bizarre covers, including the intro to Slayer's Raining Blood.

Track listing
Intro (Raining Blood-Slayer)
Brazil (Mambo Kurt) 
I Just Call To Say I Love You (Stevie Wonder)
Sweet Child Of Mine (Guns N' Roses)
Zu spät (Die Ärzte)
Mädchen Medley (contains various songs remade by Mambo Kurt)
Petra (Alle Mädchen wollen immer nur das eine) (Mambo Kurt)
Killing An Arab (The Cure) 
Just Can't Get Enough (Depeche Mode)
Leck mich an den Füßen (Mambo Kurt)
Nigger (Clawfinger)
80's Medley (Final Countdown-Europe/Eye Of The Tiger-Survivor/Jukebox-(Foreigner (band))
How You Remind Me (Nickelback)
Der Kiffer-Walzer (Mambo Kurt)
Hells Bells (AC/DC)
Polonaise (Mambo Kurt-Hidden Track-Kate Bush Wuthering Heights)

2004 albums
Covers albums
2000s comedy albums
Mambo Kurt albums